Katja Rahlwes (born 1967, Frankfurt, Germany) is a German fashion photographer, based in Paris.

Biography
Katja Rahlwes left Germany at the age of 16 for London and then moved to Paris in 1988 to study fashion design at Studio Berçot, Paris.

In 1995-2004, Rahlwes set out for a career as a freelance fashion stylist.
She met Olivier Zahm and Elein Fleiss, co-founders and publishers of Purple Prose, later called Purple fashion, in 1996. Rahlwes has been collaborating with Purple ever since and took part of a new movement of visual language in the publication world.
In 1998-2001, Rahlwes became chief-fashion editor and photo-editor at BIBA, a major market fashion magazine in Paris.

Throughout those years she would live a parallel life as a professional stylist and part-time photographer. She said it was, “like having a husband and a lover.”
In 2003, she eventually chose photography over her styling career.

Commercial work
Her work can be seen in the magazines Vogue Paris, Vogue Nippon, Vogue US, Self Service, Interview, Purple fashion, i-D, Pin Up, BUTT Magazine, New York (magazine).

She has produced photographs for brands such as Gucci, Céline, Miu Miu, Chloé, A.P.C., Maison Martin Margiela, Levi's and others.

Exhibitions
UltraMegalore, Group exhibition curated by Hannelore Knuts
at Modemuseum Hasselt, Belgium, 2010

Black Beauty, curated by Vogue Paris
at Le Printemps, Paris, France, 2008

RxART, Benefit Auction
at Phillips de Pury & Company,
New York, USA, 2007

Maison Martin Margiela, Group exhibition, Paris, France, 2007

Concrete Castle,
Group Exhibition at Confort Moderne, Poitier, France, 2007

2001/2010:les années fatales, Group Exhibition for Céline & Libération Style, Paris, France, 2004

Indigestible Correctness, Group Exhibition at Participant Inc, New York, USA, 2004

Violence the True Way, Group Exhibition at Peter Kilchmann Gallery, Zurich, Switzerland, 2003

Books
 Ezra Petronio and Suzanne Koller: Selected Works, Subjective Inventory, JRP|Ringier, 2008, 
 Purple Anthology, Rizzoli, 2008, 
 Butt Book, Taschen, 2006,

References

External links
 
 
 Interview with Katja Rahlwes at Models.com
 Katja Rahlwes photographer profile at Models.com

1967 births
Fashion photographers
Photographers from Paris
Living people
German women photographers
Photographers from Frankfurt
German emigrants to France